Laurent Nardol (born January 25, 1985 in Paris) is a French professional football player. Currently, he plays in the Championnat de France amateur for US Colomiers Football.

He played on the professional level in Ligue 2 for US Créteil-Lusitanos.

References

1985 births
Living people
Footballers from Paris
French footballers
Ligue 2 players
US Créteil-Lusitanos players
US Quevilly-Rouen Métropole players
US Colomiers Football players
Association football forwards